Arthur John Terence Dibben Wisdom (12 September 1904, in Leyton, Essex – 9 December 1993, in Cambridge), usually cited as John Wisdom, was a leading British philosopher considered to be an ordinary language philosopher, a philosopher of mind and a metaphysician.  He was influenced by G.E. Moore, Ludwig Wittgenstein and Sigmund Freud, and in turn explained and extended their work.

Wisdom was educated at Aldeburgh Lodge School, Suffolk, and Fitzwilliam House, Cambridge, where he graduated with a first-class BA degree in Moral Sciences in 1924. He is not to be confused with the philosopher John Oulton Wisdom (1908–1993), his cousin, who shared his interest in psychoanalysis.

Philosophical work
Before the posthumous publication of Wittgenstein's Philosophical Investigations in 1953, Wisdom's writing was one of the few published sources of information about Wittgenstein's later philosophy.

His article "Philosophical Perplexity" has been described as ‘something of a landmark in the history of philosophy’ being ‘the first which throughout embodied the new philosophical outlook’.

According to David Pole "in some directions at least Wisdom carries Wittgenstein's work further than he himself did, and faces its consequences more explicitly."

Wisdom was for most of his career at Trinity College, Cambridge, and became Professor of Philosophy at Cambridge University. Near the end of his career he was Professor of Philosophy at the University of Oregon. A festrchrift titled Wisdom: Twelve Essays (1974), edited by Renford Bambrough, was published near the time of his retirement from the same.

He was president of the Aristotelian Society from 1950 to 1951.

His famous "Parable of the Invisible Gardener" is a dialectic on the existence or absence of God.

The first recorded use of the term "analytic philosophers" occurred in Wisdom's 1931 work, "Interpretation and Analysis in Relation to Bentham's Theory of Definition", which expounded on Bentham's concept of "paraphrasis": "that sort of exposition which may be afforded by transmuting into a proposition, having for its subject some real entity, a proposition which has not for its subject any other than a fictitious entity". At first Wisdom referred to "logic-analytic philosophers", then to "analytic philosophers". According to Michael Beaney, "the explicit articulation of the idea of paraphrasis in the work of both Wisdom in Cambridge and Ryle in Oxford represents a definite stage in the construction of analytic philosophy as a tradition".

He was cremated and his ashes were buried at the Parish of the Ascension Burial Ground in Cambridge.

Quotes

Major writings
 Interpretation and Analysis in Relation to Bentham's Theory of Definition (1931)
 Problems of Mind and Matter (1934)
 "Philosophical Perplexity," Proceedings of the Aristotelian Society, Volume 37, Issue 1, 1 June 1937, Pages 71–88,
 Other Minds (1952, 1965)
 Philosophy and Psycho-analysis (1953)
 Paradox and Discovery (1965)
 Proof and Explanation, the Virginia Lectures, 1957 (1991)

References

External links
Arthur John Terence Dibben Wisdom memorial page from Trinity College Chapel.
Obituary: Professor John Wisdom by Ilham Dilman  in The Independent 15 December 1993
Obituary: Professor John Wisdom by Andor Gomm in The Independent 29 December 1993

1904 births
1993 deaths
20th-century British philosophers
Philosophers of language
Philosophers of mind
Presidents of the Aristotelian Society
Alumni of Fitzwilliam College, Cambridge
Fellows of Trinity College, Cambridge
University of Oregon faculty
Bertrand Russell Professors of Philosophy